Missouri, Kansas and Texas Railroad Depot may refer to:

Missouri, Kansas and Texas Railroad Depot (Boonville, Missouri), listed on the NRHP in Missouri
Missouri, Kansas, and Texas Railroad Depot (Columbia, Missouri), listed on the NRHP in Missouri
Missouri, Kansas and Texas Railroad Depot (Sedalia, Missouri), listed on the NRHP in Missouri